Colin Forbes (born February 16, 1976) is a Canadian former professional ice hockey forward who played in the National Hockey League (NHL) for the Philadelphia Flyers, Tampa Bay Lightning, Ottawa Senators, New York Rangers and Washington Capitals. Drafted 166th overall by the Flyers in the 1994 NHL Entry Draft, Forbes played a total of nine seasons in the NHL.

Forbes played the last five seasons of his professional career in Europe with the Adler Mannheim and lastly ERC Ingolstadt of the Deutsche Eishockey Liga (DEL).

Career statistics

Regular season and playoffs

References

External links

 

1976 births
Living people
Adler Mannheim players
Canadian expatriate ice hockey players in Germany
Canadian ice hockey centres
ERC Ingolstadt players
Hershey Bears players
Ice hockey people from British Columbia
Lowell Lock Monsters players
New York Rangers players
Ottawa Senators players
Philadelphia Flyers draft picks
Philadelphia Flyers players
Philadelphia Phantoms players
Portland Pirates players
Portland Winterhawks players
Sherwood Park Crusaders players
Sportspeople from New Westminster
Tampa Bay Lightning players
Utah Grizzlies (AHL) players
Washington Capitals players